Manvel Badeyan (29 June 1957 – 30 September 2022) was an Armenian politician. He attended the Armenian State University of Economics. Badeyan served as a Republican Party of Armenia member of the National Assembly of Armenia from 1999 to 2003. He served as the Armenian ambassador to Kuwait from 2016 to 2018.

References 

1957 births
2022 deaths
People from Gavar
Republican Party of Armenia politicians
20th-century Armenian politicians
21st-century Armenian politicians
Armenian State University of Economics alumni
Members of the National Assembly (Armenia)